Bobowicko  (formerly German Bobelwitz) is a village in the administrative district of Gmina Międzyrzecz, within Międzyrzecz County, Lubusz Voivodeship, in western Poland.

The village has a population of 714 (population in 2008).

Sports
 GKS Favor Bobowicko (founded August 1, 1999) – men's football club (Polish league level 7)

References

Bobowicko